Barbora Krejčíková and Kateřina Siniaková were the defending champions, but Krejčíková chose not to participate in the doubles event at this tournament. 

Arantxa Rus and Tamara Zidanšek won the title, defeating Siniaková and Lucie Hradecká in the final, 6–3, 6–4.

Seeds

Draw

Draw

References

External Links
 Main Draw

Upper Austria Ladies Linz – Doubles
Upper Austria Ladies Linz Doubles